Caribicus is a genus of diploglossid lizards endemic to the island of Hispaniola in the Caribbean, in both the Dominican Republic and Haiti.

Conservation
All three species are considered threatened on the IUCN Red List, and one is possibly extinct.

Taxonomy
There are three species in this genus, all of which were formerly classified in the genus Celestus.

Species 
 Caribicus anelpistus  - Altagracia giant galliwasp (possibly extinct)
 Caribicus darlingtoni  - Hispaniolan striped galliwasp 
 Caribicus warreni  - Haitian giant galliwasp

References

Caribicus
Lizard genera
Lizards of the Caribbean
Endemic fauna of Hispaniola